Cnemaspis samui is a species of diurnal, rock-dwelling, insectivorous gecko endemic to  Thailand.

The species name refers to the type locality of the species, Ko Samui.

References

 Cnemaspis samui

samui
Reptiles of Thailand
Reptiles described in 2022
Endemic fauna of Thailand